Florence d'Harcourt, née Deville (10 March 1929 – 6 June 2022), was a French politician.

Biography

Family
Florence was the daughter of industrialist  and his wife, painter Élisabeth Labbé de La Mauvinère.

Professional career
D'Harcourt worked as a flight attendant for Trans World Airlines and was president of the Centre féminin d'études et d'information Femme-Avenir. She also served on the High Court of France and was Vice-President of the Haut Comité pour la Défense Civile.

Political career
In 1974, d'Harcourt was named Secretary-General of the Rally for the Republic. She was a substitute for Achille Peretti and replaced him in 1977 when he was appointed to the Constitutional Council. In 1978, she was asked to give up her seat to Robert Hersant so that she could represent a constituency in Paris, rather than Hauts-de-Seine's 6th constituency. However, she refused and triggered a duel which fascinated the media.

D'Harcourt was re-elected in 1981 and 1986 before being dismissed by her party in favor of the up-and-coming Nicolas Sarkozy.

After politics
After she retired from politics, d'Harcourt wrote about the history and civilization of the inhabitants of the Himalayas, the Alps, the Atlas, and the Andes. She took many trips to such places and brought back photographic reports.

Florence d'Harcourt died in Vaucresson on 6 June 2022 at the age of 93.

Works
La loi du clan (1997)
Tante Yvonne une femme d'officier (2007)
Ballade au pays des dieux (2013)
Maroc. Rencontres au pays berbère (2016)

References

1929 births
2022 deaths
20th-century French women politicians
Deputies of the 6th National Assembly of the French Fifth Republic
Deputies of the 7th National Assembly of the French Fifth Republic
Deputies of the 8th National Assembly of the French Fifth Republic
Union for French Democracy politicians
Rally for the Republic politicians
Florence
Politicians from Paris